The City Dark is a documentary film by filmmaker Ian Cheney about light pollution. It won the Best Score/Music Award at the 2011 SXSW Film Festival and was nominated for at the 34th News & Documentary Emmy Awards.

References

External links
 
 

Documentary films about environmental issues
>
Films directed by Ian Cheney
POV (TV series) films
2011 films
2011 documentary films
2010s American films